The 1883–84 season was the first season in which Newton Heath LYR F.C. competed in a senior competitive football competition, having spent the first five years of their existence playing friendly matches against local clubs. The club entered the Lancashire Cup in October 1883, but were knocked out in the first round by Blackburn Olympic's reserve team.

Lancashire Cup
For their first ever competitive match, Newton Heath were drawn at home to Blackburn Olympic in the first round of the Lancashire Cup. The opposition had won the FA Cup the previous season, beating Old Etonians in the final. However, they did not seem to be taking Newton Heath seriously, sending only their reserve team for the match, which was played on 27 October 1883. This gave the Heathens every chance of progressing to the next round, and indeed they were only 2–1 down at half-time. They then equalised shortly after the break, but were then hit by a barrage of goals, eventually losing the tie 7–2.

It is assumed that Newton Heath's North Road ground had become an enclosed structure by this point, as the club charged an entry fee of 3d for entry.

Friendlies

References

Manchester United F.C. seasons
Newton Heath Lyr